Saruga is a genus of flies in the family Stratiomyidae.

Species
Saruga conifera Walker, 1859
Saruga esenini Krivosheina, 1993

References

Stratiomyidae
Brachycera genera
Taxa named by Francis Walker (entomologist)
Diptera of Asia
Diptera of Australasia